Hernando Barrientos (born 5 January 1953) is a Colombian sports shooter. He competed in the men's 10 metre running target event at the 1992 Summer Olympics.

References

1953 births
Living people
Colombian male sport shooters
Olympic shooters of Colombia
Shooters at the 1992 Summer Olympics
Place of birth missing (living people)
20th-century Colombian people